The gas leak phone call scam was a series of incidents in 2016. The incidents involve a person prank calling a restaurant, claiming to be a fire department official and then convincing managers to break all the windows to prevent a gas explosion occurring due a supposed gas leak. The calls have been most often placed at fast food restaurants in the United States.

Incidents
A caller who identifies themselves as a firefighter or other authority figure contacts a manager or supervisor and would solicit their help in combating a gas leak at the restaurant by breaking all the windows causing thousands of dollars in damages to the establishment.

Some notable incidents were:
Two calls were reported on January 30, 2016: one at a Wendy's restaurant in Phoenix, Arizona and a Burger King restaurant in Morro Bay, California.
On February 2, 2016 a Jack in the Box restaurant in Tucson, Arizona.
On April 7, 2016, a Burger King restaurant in Shawnee, Oklahoma where workers were told to break the windows due to build-up of carbon monoxide.
On April 8, 2016, a Burger King restaurant in Coon Rapids, Minnesota.
On April 10, 2016, a Jack in the Box restaurant in Indianapolis, Indiana.

None of the prank callers were ever identified or caught, likely due to usage of Caller ID spoofing.

References

2016 hoaxes
Hoaxes in the United States
Impostors
Telephone crimes